Jacques Herbillon (20 May 1936 – 16 May 2003) was a French baritone.

Life 
He received the Gabriel Fauré Grand Prize and the Geneva International Music Competition Prize.

A great specialist of Gabriel Fauré, from 1961 he undertook numerous concert and recital tours under the aegis of the Jeunesses musicales de France. He performed internationally in many chamber operas and also participated in many premieres.

He recorded Fauré's melodies with the Romanian pianist Théodore Paraskivesco, including La bonne chanson and L'horizon chimérique and also an album of mélodies by Ravel including the Don Quichotte à Dulcinée song cycle; these recordings were issued by the Calliope label.

Discography

33rpm 
 Gabriel Fauré, Mélodies, with Théodore Paraskivesco (piano), Op. 1, 2, 4, 5, 6, 7 and 8 — CAL 1841
 Gabriel Fauré, Mélodies, with Théodore Paraskivesco (piano), p. 21 Poème d’un jour, Op. 18, 23, 27, 39 and 43 — CAL 1842
 Gabriel Fauré, Mélodies, with Théodore Paraskivesco (piano), Op. 58 5 Mélodies de Venise', Op. 46, 51 and 57 — CAL 1843
 Gabriel Fauré, Mélodies, with Théodore Paraskivesco (piano), Op. 61 La Bonne Chanson, Op. 76, 83, 85 and 86 — CAL 1844
 Gabriel Fauré, Mélodies, with Théodore Paraskivesco (piano), Op. 3 nº2, Op. 92, 94, Op. 106 Le Jardin Clos, Op. 113 Mirages, L'horizon chimérique'' — CAL 1845
 Henri Duparc, Mélodies, with Chantal Debuchy (piano) — CAL 1801
 Maurice Ravel, Mélodies, with Théodore Paraskivesco (piano) — CAL 1856

External links 
 Death of Jacques Herbillon on Forum Opera
 Discography on Discogs
 Jacques Herbillon on IDref
 Duparc - L'invitation au voyage (YouTube)

1936 births
2003 deaths
Musicians from Reims
École Normale de Musique de Paris alumni
20th-century French male opera singers
French operatic baritones